Alvania simulans is a species of minute sea snail, a marine gastropod mollusk or micromollusk in the family Rissoidae.

Description
Alvania simulans has a small (1.5-2mm) shell that is pearly white in color, and partially translucent.

Distribution

Alvania simulans is found in the North Atlantic and European waters.

References

External links

Rissoidae
Gastropods described in 1886